The Valentine-Eleebana Red Devils are a junior rugby league club based in Lake Macquarie, NSW. They were formed in 1970, and have become a feeder club for Lakes United in the Newcastle Rugby League and the Newcastle Knights in the National Rugby League.

Notable Rugby League Alumni
 Paul Harragon
 Brett Kimmorley
 Michael Ennis
 Adam Muir
 Luke Burt
 Brett Finch
 Clint Newton
 Willie Mason
 Josh Perry
 Sam Stone
 Jack Hetherington
 Grant Anderson

See also

References

External links
 Michael Ennis latest Blue off Valentine-Eleebana production line

Rugby league teams in Newcastle, New South Wales
Rugby clubs established in 1970
1970 establishments in Australia